Carofiglio is an Italian family name meaning "dear son".

People 
 Desiree Carofiglio (born 2000), Italian artistic gymnast
 Dora Carofiglio (born 1963), alias Valerie Dore, Italian singer
 Francesco Carofiglio (born 1964), Italian architect, writer and director
 Gianrico Carofiglio (born 1961), Italian novelist and former judge

Italian-language surnames